Robert Norman Hunt (24 September 1903 Worsley, Lancashire - 13 October 1983 Somerstown, Chichester) was an English cricketer.

Nobby Hunt was a leading club cricketer between the world wars, captaining Barclays Bank Cricket Club and also Club Cricket Conference elevens. He played in eight first-class matches for Middlesex between 1926 and 1928 as a right-handed batsman and right-arm fast-medium bowler. He scored 138 runs (average 19.71), with a personal best of 81* versus Worcestershire in 1926. He also took five wickets (average 89.80) with a personal best of 3/32.

1903 births
1983 deaths
English cricketers
Middlesex cricketers
People from Worsley